The Al-Imtizaj Mosque is a mosque in Bandung, West Java, Indonesia.

History
The establishment of the mosque was proposed by West Java former Governor R. Nuriana. A former Matahari department store was chosen to be the site for the mosque. The construction then started in 2008 and completed in 2010. The official opening of the mosque was held on 6 August 2010.

Architecture
The mosque was constructed in Chinese architecture style. It is housed in building with red, golden and yellow colors. The front part of the mosque stands a 5-meter high paifang. It consists of two floors and has a capacity of 200 worshippers.

Transportation
The mosque is accessible within walking distance south east of Bandung Station of Kereta Api Indonesia.

See also
 List of mosques in Indonesia

References

2010 establishments in Indonesia
Chinese architecture in Indonesia
Mosques completed in 2010
Mosques in Bandung